In number theory, a normal order of an arithmetic function is some simpler or better-understood function which "usually" takes the same or closely approximate values.

Let f be a function on the natural numbers.  We say that g is a normal order of f if for every ε > 0, the inequalities

hold for almost all n: that is, if the proportion of n ≤ x for which this does not hold tends to 0 as x tends to infinity.

It is conventional to assume that the approximating function g is continuous and monotone.

Examples
 The Hardy–Ramanujan theorem: the normal order of ω(n), the number of distinct prime factors of n, is log(log(n));
 The normal order of Ω(n), the number of prime factors of n counted with multiplicity, is log(log(n));
 The normal order of log(d(n)), where d(n) is the number of divisors of n, is log(2) log(log(n)).

See also
 Average order of an arithmetic function
 Divisor function
 Extremal orders of an arithmetic function
 Turán–Kubilius inequality

References
 
 . p. 473

External links
 

Arithmetic functions